Ewout Holst (born 8 October 1978 in The Hague, South Holland, Netherlands) is a Dutch former freestyle and butterfly swimmer.

Holst's early years were spent abroad, travelling with his family to the various postings his father was given as a government official. It was whilst at school in Bonn that his skills as a swimmer became recognised.

He gained his first selection for the Dutch Team for the 1998 European Short Course Swimming Championships in Sheffield. He was disqualified in the heats of the 4 × 100 m freestyle relay at the 2000 Summer Olympics in Sydney, Australia. After a troubled period he decided to quit swimming after coming seventh in the 50 metres butterfly at the 2004 European Aquatics Championships in Madrid, Spain.

Personal best times

References
 Profile on Zwemkroniek
 Dutch Olympic Committee

1978 births
Living people
Dutch male freestyle swimmers
Dutch male butterfly swimmers
Olympic swimmers of the Netherlands
Swimmers at the 2000 Summer Olympics
Swimmers from The Hague
20th-century Dutch people
21st-century Dutch people